Terrestrial Time (TT) is a modern astronomical time standard defined by the International Astronomical Union, primarily for time-measurements of astronomical observations made from the surface of Earth.
For example, the Astronomical Almanac uses TT for its tables of positions (ephemerides) of the Sun, Moon and planets as seen from Earth. In this role, TT continues Terrestrial Dynamical Time (TDT or TD), which succeeded ephemeris time (ET). TT shares the original purpose for which ET was designed, to be free of the irregularities in the rotation of Earth.

The unit of TT is the SI second, the definition of which is based currently on the caesium atomic clock, but TT is not itself defined by atomic clocks.  It is a theoretical ideal, and real clocks can only approximate it.

TT is distinct from the time scale often used as a basis for civil purposes, Coordinated Universal Time (UTC).  TT is indirectly the basis of UTC, via International Atomic Time (TAI).  Because of the historical difference between TAI and ET when TT was introduced, TT is approximately 32.184 s ahead of TAI.

History

A definition of a terrestrial time standard was adopted by the International Astronomical Union (IAU) in 1976 at its XVI General Assembly and later named Terrestrial Dynamical Time (TDT). It was the counterpart to Barycentric Dynamical Time (TDB), which was a time standard for Solar system ephemerides, to be based on a dynamical time scale. Both of these time standards turned out to be imperfectly defined. Doubts were also expressed about the meaning of 'dynamical' in the name TDT.

In 1991, in Recommendation IV of the XXI General Assembly, the IAU redefined TDT, also renaming it "Terrestrial Time". TT was formally defined in terms of Geocentric Coordinate Time (TCG), defined by the IAU on the same occasion. TT was defined to be a linear scaling of TCG, such that the unit of TT is the "SI second on the geoid", i.e. the rate approximately matched the rate of proper time on the Earth's surface at mean sea level.

In 2000, the IAU very slightly altered the definition of TT by adopting an exact value, .

Current definition

TT differs from Geocentric Coordinate Time (TCG) by a constant rate.  Formally it is defined by the equation

Due to the term  the rate of TT is very slightly slower than that of TCG.

The equation linking TT and TCG more commonly has the form given by the IAU,

where  is the TCG time expressed as a Julian date (JD). The Julian Date is a linear transformation of the raw count of seconds represented by the variable TCG, so this form of the equation is not simplified. The use of a Julian Date specifies the epoch fully. The above equation is often given with the Julian Date  for the epoch, but that is inexact (though inappreciably so, because of the small size of the multiplier ). The value  is exactly in accord with the definition.

Time coordinates on the TT and TCG scales are specified conventionally using traditional means of specifying days, inherited from non-uniform time standards based on the rotation of Earth. Specifically, both Julian Dates and the Gregorian calendar are used. For continuity with their predecessor Ephemeris Time (ET), TT and TCG were set to match ET at around Julian Date  (1977-01-01T00Z). More precisely, it was defined that TT instant 1977-01-01T00:00:32.184 and TCG instant 1977-01-01T00:00:32.184 exactly correspond to the International Atomic Time (TAI) instant 1977-01-01T00:00:00.000. This is also the instant at which TAI introduced corrections for gravitational time dilation.

TT and TCG expressed as Julian Dates can be related precisely and most simply by the equation

where  is  exactly.

Realizations

TT is a theoretical ideal, not dependent on a particular realization. For practical purposes, TT must be realized by actual clocks in the Earth system.

TAI 

The main realization of TT is supplied by TAI. The TAI service, performed since 1958, estimates TT using measurements from an ensemble of atomic clocks spread over the surface and low orbital space of Earth. TAI is canonically defined retrospectively, in monthly bulletins, in relation to the readings shown by that particular group of atomic clocks at the time.  Estimates of TAI are also provided in real time by the institutions that operate the participating clocks.  Because of the historical difference between TAI and ET when TT was introduced, the TAI realization of TT is defined thus:

TT(BIPM) 

Because TAI is never revised once published, it is possible for errors in it to become known and remain uncorrected. Approximately annually since 1992, the International Bureau of Weights and Measures (BIPM) has produced better realizations of TT based on reanalysis of historical TAI data.  BIPM's realizations of TT  are named in the form "TT(BIPM08)", with the digits indicating the year of publication.  They are published in the form of a table of differences from TT(TAI), along with an extrapolation equation that may be used for dates later than the table. The latest  is TT(BIPM21).

Others 

Researchers from the International Pulsar Timing Array collaboration have created a realization of TT based on observations of an ensemble of pulsars.  This new pulsar time scale is an independent means of computing TT, and it may eventually be useful to identify defects in TAI.

Approximation

Sometimes times described in TT are used in situations where TT's detailed theoretical properties are not significant.  Where millisecond accuracy is enough (or more than enough), TT can be summarized in the following manners:

 To millisecond accuracy, TT is parallel to the atomic timescale (International Atomic Time, TAI) maintained by the BIPM.  TT is ahead of TAI, and can be approximated as TT ≅ TAI + 32.184 seconds. (The offset 32.184 s arises from the history.)
 TT is also parallel with the GPS time scale, which has a constant difference from atomic time (TAI − GPS time = +19 seconds), so that TT ≅ GPS time + 51.184 seconds.
 TT is in effect a continuation of (but is more precisely uniform than) the former Ephemeris Time (ET).  It was designed for continuity with ET, and it runs at the rate of the SI second, which was itself derived from a calibration using the second of ET (see, under Ephemeris time, Redefinition of the second and Implementations).
TT is slightly ahead of UT1 (a refined measure of mean solar time at Greenwich) by an amount known as ΔT = TT − UT1.  ΔT was measured at +67.6439 seconds (TT ahead of UT1) at 0h UTC on 1 January 2015; and by retrospective calculation, ΔT was close to zero about the year 1900.  The difference ΔT, though somewhat unpredictable in fine detail, is expected to continue to increase, with UT1 becoming steadily (but irregularly) further behind TT in the future.

Relativistic relationships

Observers in different locations, that are in relative motion or at different altitudes, can disagree about the rates of each other's clocks, owing to effects described by the theory of relativity.  As a result, TT (even as a theoretical ideal) does not match the proper time of all observers.

In relativistic terms, TT is described as the proper time of a clock located on the geoid (essentially mean sea level).
However,
TT is now actually defined as a coordinate time scale.
The redefinition did not quantitatively change TT, but rather made the existing definition more precise.  In effect it defined the geoid (mean sea level) in terms of a particular level of gravitational time dilation relative to a notional observer located at infinitely high altitude.

The present definition of TT is a linear scaling of Geocentric Coordinate Time (TCG), which is the proper time of a notional observer who is infinitely far away (so not affected by gravitational time dilation) and at rest relative to Earth. TCG is used to date mainly for theoretical purposes in astronomy. From the point of view of an observer on Earth's surface the second of TCG passes in slightly less than the observer's SI second. The comparison of the observer's clock against TT depends on the observer's altitude: they will match on the geoid, and clocks at higher altitude tick slightly faster.

See also
Barycentric Coordinate Time
Geocentric Coordinate Time

References

External links
BIPM technical services: Time Metrology
Time and Frequency from A to Z

Time scales
Earth
Time in astronomy